Shiraz Adam is a Canadian actor who was the voice actor for the character Esteban in the English version of the animated series The Mysterious Cities of Gold. Shiraz was no more than 9 when he played the voice of Esteban, which was his first and only acting role.

Adam went on to study at McGill University and is currently an engineer.

References

External links

Year of birth missing (living people)
Living people
Canadian male child actors
Canadian male voice actors
McGill University Faculty of Engineering alumni
Canadian male actors of Indian descent